Quaqtaq Airport  is located near Quaqtaq, Quebec, Canada. Due to the landfill northeast of the runway birds and dogs may be encountered.

Airlines and destinations

References

External links

Certified airports in Nord-du-Québec